The State Register of Heritage Places is maintained by the Heritage Council of Western Australia. , 401 places are heritage-listed in the City of Bayswater, of which 24 are on the State Register of Heritage Places.

List
The Western Australian State Register of Heritage Places, lists the following 24 state registered places within the City of Bayswater:

References

Bayswater